McNabb is a Scottish surname. Notable people with the surname include:

 Brayden McNabb (born 1991), Canadian ice hockey player for the Vegas Golden Knights
 Carl McNabb (1917–2007), baseball player
 Charles H. McNabb, American politician
 Chet McNabb (1920–1990), American professional basketball player
 D. Paul McNabb (died 1963), American politician
 Donald McNabb (1870–1934), Canadian politician
 Donovan McNabb (born 1976), former American football quarterback
 Duncan McNabb (born 1952), US Air Force general
 Edgar McNabb (1865–1894), baseball player
 Ian McNabb (born 1960), British musician
 J. Martin McNabb (died 1926), American politician
 James McNabb (c. 1776–1820), Upper Canadian businessman and political figure
 James Alexander MacNabb (1901–1990), British rower
 Juan Conway McNabb (1925–2016), Catholic bishop
 Ross McNabb (1934–1972), New Zealand mycologist
 Sean McNabb (born 1965), American musician (bassist)
 Vincent McNabb (1868–1943), Irish scholar and priest

See also
 Clan MacNab, a Scottish clan
 McNabb, Illinois, a village in the United States
 McNab (disambiguation)